Leana de Bruin (née du Plooy) (born 9 July 1977) is a South African and New Zealand international netball player. De Bruin played 34 tests for South Africa before moving to New Zealand in 2000. She made her on-court debut for the Silver Ferns in 2003, and has gone on to represent New Zealand at the Commonwealth Games and Netball World Championships, playing in the goal defence and goal keeper positions. In 2009, she pulled out of the team due to pregnancy, before returning the following year.

De Bruin played for the Southern Sting, Capital Shakers, Waikato Bay of Plenty Magic and the Northern Force in the National Bank Cup. With the start of the ANZ Championship in 2008, de Bruin stayed in Auckland with the new Northern Mystics franchise. The following year, she returned to the Magic in Hamilton, partnering in the defensive circle with Silver Ferns teammate Casey Williams. De Bruin played most of the 2009 round-robin season before pulling out due to pregnancy. She returned to competitive netball the following year, signing with the Southern Steel for the 2010 season, before returning to the Magic in 2012 for the remainder of the ANZ Championship.

She announced that she would retire from international netball in July 2016. Domestically, she signed with the Northern Stars for the inaugural season of the new ANZ Premiership, delaying her retirement from all forms of the game. She signed with Australian club Adelaide Thunderbirds for the 2018 Suncorp Super Netball season. She was named captain of the Thunderbirds prior to the start of the season. de Brun was captain at a difficult time for the club, as the Thunderbirds went winless for the entire season. She then returned to the Northern Stars for the 2019 season, extending her career beyond 17 years.

References

External links 
 2011 Silver Ferns profile
 2010 Southern Steel profile
 2010 ANZ Championship profile

1977 births
Living people
South African netball players
New Zealand netball players
New Zealand international netball players
Commonwealth Games medallists in netball
Commonwealth Games gold medallists for New Zealand
Netball players at the 2006 Commonwealth Games
Netball players at the 2010 Commonwealth Games
Netball players at the 2014 Commonwealth Games
2003 World Netball Championships players
2007 World Netball Championships players
2011 World Netball Championships players
2015 Netball World Cup players
Adelaide Thunderbirds players
Northern Stars players
Southern Steel players
Waikato Bay of Plenty Magic players
Northern Mystics players
Northern Force players
Capital Shakers players
ANZ Championship players
ANZ Premiership players
South African expatriate netball people in New Zealand
South African expatriate netball people in Australia
New Zealand expatriate netball people in Australia
People from Bethlehem, Free State
Southern Sting players
New Zealand international Fast5 players
Medallists at the 2006 Commonwealth Games
Medallists at the 2010 Commonwealth Games
Medallists at the 2014 Commonwealth Games